The Haringey Huskies are a British ice hockey team based in London, England. The Huskies are members of the NIHL 2 South East Division and play their home games at Alexandra Palace.

Formation
The EIHA announced on 1 June 2017 that the Haringey Racers would no longer be operating a NIHL franchise out of Alexandra Palace, instead  a new team, the Haringey Huskies, would be offered the Racers spot in the league.

This announcement was not without controversy as Racers owner David Richards Jnr would claim that the franchise had been stolen from him by the Huskies ownership. The EIHA would later state that this was not the case and that the Racers were unable to compete due to a "breakdown in the relationship between themselves and Alexandra Palace, which includes substantial monies still owed", and as such they approved the Huskies filling the slot left by the Racers. The first player signed to the Huskies was former Racer Stuart Appleby.

The Huskies faced the Basingstoke Buffalo in their maiden game, suffering a 6–3 loss, however, due to the Buffalo fielding an ineligible player, this result was overturned and the Huskies declared the victors. During this game, Ben Osborne scored the first goal in franchise history.
In the 2020 Wilkinson cup (NIHL south 2) the huskies came top, winning the cup.

Club roster 2020–21

2020/21 Outgoing

References

Ice hockey teams in England
Ice hockey clubs established in 2017
Ice hockey teams in London
Sport in the London Borough of Haringey
2017 establishments in England